Papyrus 12 (in the Gregory-Aland numbering), α 1033 (in the Soden numbering), designated by siglum 𝔓12, is an early copy of the New Testament in Greek. It is a papyrus manuscript of the Epistle to the Hebrews, it contains only Hebrews 1:1. The manuscript palaeographically has been assigned to ca. 285. It may have been a writing exercise or an amulet.

Description 

On the top of the second column another writer has penned Hebrews 1:1 in three lines. It has been written in a small uncial hand. On the verso of this manuscript another writer has penned Genesis 1:1-5 according to Septuaginta.

 Text
 πολυμερως κ πολυ[τρο]πως
 παλε ο θς λαλήσ[α]ς το[ις π]ατρα
 σ[ι] ημ[ω]ν εν τοις προ[φηταις]

It has error of itacism (παλε instead of παλαι), the nomina sacra contracted (θς).

The Greek text of this codex probably is a representative of the Alexandrian text-type, but its text is too brief for certainty. Aland placed it in Category I. 

It supports textual variant with ημων as in codices 𝔓46c a t v vgmss syrp.

History 

The manuscript was discovered in 1897 by Grenfell and Hunt.

It is currently housed at The Morgan Library & Museum (Pap. Gr. 3; P. Amherst 3b) in New York City.

See also 

 List of New Testament papyri
 Papyrus Amherst 3a

References

Further reading 

 B. P. Grenfell & A. S. Hunt, The Amherst Papyri I, (London 1900), pp. 30–31. (P. Amherst 3 b).
 

New Testament papyri
3rd-century biblical manuscripts
Septuagint manuscripts
Early Greek manuscripts of the New Testament
Amherst papyri
Collection of the Morgan Library & Museum
Epistle to the Hebrews papyri